Chiang Wing Hung (born 11 January 1962) is a Hong Kong rower. He competed in the men's double sculls event at the 1992 Summer Olympics.

References

External links
 

1962 births
Living people
Hong Kong male rowers
Olympic rowers of Hong Kong
Rowers at the 1992 Summer Olympics
Place of birth missing (living people)
Asian Games medalists in rowing
Rowers at the 1994 Asian Games
Asian Games bronze medalists for Hong Kong
Medalists at the 1994 Asian Games
20th-century Hong Kong people